Navdeep Hospital, Hair transplant & Laser Clinic is a private, multispeciality hospital in Panipat, India. It is located in 112, Sukhdev Nagar, Panipat. The hospital, which is named after Dr Navdeep Goyal, was established in 2009 to provide medical care to natives of Panipat and nearby districts.

Medical superintendent: Dr Navdeep Goyal.

Notes

Hospitals in Haryana
Nursing homes in India
Panipat
Hospital buildings completed in 2009
2009 establishments in Haryana